Alexander Brown is an English music video director and album cover designer.

Brown's design for La Roux's debut album cover was named one of the best of 2009.

He won the 2006 Yahoo! Sharpener Award for final year university design students, during his final year at Goldsmiths College.

Brown's design for Maribou State's 2018 album, Kingdoms in Colour, was featured in Creative Review's 'Best Record Sleeves of the Year'.

Music video filmography
Owl City - "Umbrella Beach"
Tinashé - "Mayday"
Goldhawks - "Running Away"
The Maccabees - "No Kind Words" 
The Maccabees - "Empty Vessels"' feat Roots Manuva
Stornoway - "Zorbing"
James Blake - "The Wilhelm Scream"
Gabrielle Aplin - The Power of Love
La Roux - "Kiss And Not Tell"
James Blake - "If The Car Beside You Moves Ahead"

References

External links
Official site
Alexander Brown at Davey Inc

1985 births
English music video directors
Living people
People from Stoke-on-Trent
Alumni of Goldsmiths, University of London